Let's Part in Style is the third studio album of Canadian performer Chinawoman.

It was released on February 24, 2014. All tracks were written, performed and produced by Chinawoman.

Tracks 
 Vacation from Love
 Good Times Don't Carry Over
 Woman is Still a Woman
 To Be With Others
 Where Goes The Night
 What Was Said
 Nothing to Talk About
 Blue Eyes Unchanged
 Waltz #1
 Let's Part in Style

Personnel 

To Be With Others and Where Goes The Night produced by Chinawoman and Van Roland.

 Chinawoman: vocals, synthesizers, guitars
 Van Roland: electric guitar & sfx on Vacation & To Be With Others
 Sam Cino: drums & percussion engineered and performed on Nothing to Talk About and Blue Eyes Unchanged
 Diego Ferri: lead guitar on To Be With Others
 André Tremblay: spoken word section on Nothing to Talk About  and translation into French

Mixed by Chinawoman except 4, 5 & 8 mixed by Van Roland, 2 & 7 mixed by Peter Jensen and 3 & 10 mixed by Diego Ferri.
Mastered by Diego Ferri.
Album design by Áron Jancsó.

References 

2014 albums